Ketengban, also known as Kupel, is a Papuan language spoken in Pegunungan Bintang Regency, Highland Papua, Indonesia, near the Papua New Guinea border.

Dialects are Okbab (Okbap), Bime, Onya (Eastern Una; cf. Una), Omban (Kamume), Sirkai.

References
John Louwerse, 1988, The morphosyntax of Una in relation to discourse structure

Mek languages
Languages of western New Guinea